is a Japanese voice actor. He is affiliated with Mausu Promotion.

Filmography

Television animation
1998
Detective Conan (Kenichi Hirai)
Maico 2010 (Kacchin, Katsuo)
2001
Baki the Grappler (Ian McGregor)
2002
Mao Dante (Samael)
2003
Astro Boy: Mighty Atom (Joe)
Stellvia of the Universe (Miguel del Toro)
2004
Agatha Christie's Great Detectives Poirot and Marple (Anman Dubon, Omāfī, Kinburu, Inspector Bēkon, others)
KURAU Phantom Memory (Hajime)
2005
Naruto (Sangorō)
Starship Operators (Connelly, Louis Belmont)
Tide-Line Blue (KC)
2006
Crash B-Daman (Kyōsuke's father)
D.Gray-man (Guzol)
Death Note (Steve Mason)
The Story of Saiunkoku (Shungai So-Taifuu)
Utawarerumono (Orikakan)
2007
Shugo Chara! (Kazuomi Hoshina)
2009
Fullmetal Alchemist: Brotherhood (Mick)
2011
Anohana: The Flower We Saw That Day (Atsushi Yadomi)
Steins;Gate (Dr. Nakabachi)
2012
High School DxD (Issei's father)
2014
Argevollen (Eraldo Quasimodo)
2016
2017
Natsume Yūjin-chō Roku (Homeroom Teacher)Food Wars! The Second Plate (Kakinoshin Ōizumi)
2019Star Twinkle PreCure (Harukichi Hoshina)Fruits Basket (Kazuma's Grandfather)
2021Resident Evil: Infinite Darkness (Ryan)

Unknown date
Azuki-chan (Gōzō)
Black Cat (Rugdoll)
Mahōjin Guru Guru (Tatejiwanezumi, Ragira, Tokuro, Kuroko, Shinto priest, villager, merchant, soldier, others)
Pokémon (Growlithe, Arcanine, Xatu, others)
Pokémon Advanced Generation (Tamuramaro)
Viewtiful Joe (Charles the Third)

Theatrical animationPokémon: The First Movie (1998) (Dragonite)Tokyo Godfathers (2003) (Hidenari Ugaki)My Hero Academia: Two Heroes (2018) (Samuel Abraham)

Video games

 AI: The Somnium Files – nirvanA Initiative (Chikara Horadori)Crash Bandicoot (Doctor Nitrus Brio (Brendan O'Brien))Crash Bandicoot 2: Cortex Strikes Back (Doctor Nitrus Brio (Brendan O'Brien))Crash Bash (Doctor Nitrus Brio, Rilla Roo (Brendan O'Brien, Frank Welker))Crash Tag Team Racing (Doctor N. Gin (Nolan North))Dark Cloud 2 (Mayor Need, Mogley)Kingdom Hearts II (Piglet (Travis Oates))Crash Bandicoot: N-Sane Trilogy (Doctor Nitrus Brio (Maurice LaMarche))JoJo's Bizarre Adventure: All-Star Battle (Steven Steel)JoJo's Bizarre Adventure: Eyes of Heaven (Steven Steel)Kingdom Hearts III (Piglet (Travis Oates))Night Trap (Eddie)Shinobido: Way of the Ninja (Bodyguard)Tenchu 2: Birth of the Stealth Assassins (Semimaru)The Last Remnant (Pagus)The Witcher 3: Wild Hunt (Vesemir)

TokusatsuMahou Sentai Magiranger (2005) (Hades God Titan (eps. 35 - 46))Tensou Sentai Goseiger (2010) (Gubydal Alien Zaruwakku of the UFO (ep. 2))Uchu Sentai Kyuranger (2017) (Gyapler (ep. 24))

Dubbing roles

Live-actionThe Adjustment Bureau (Charlie Traynor (Michael Kelly))Alice in Wonderland (Tweedledee and Tweedledum (Matt Lucas))Alice Through the Looking Glass (Tweedledee and Tweedledum (Matt Lucas))Ant-Man (Dale (Gregg Turkington))Ant-Man and the Wasp: Quantumania (Dale (Gregg Turkington))Batman Begins (Joe Chill (Richard Brake))The Benchwarmers (Richie Goodman (David Spade))Born to Raise Hell (Costel (Darren Shahlavi))Christopher Robin (Piglet)The Conjuring 2 (Maurice Grosse (Simon McBurney))The Devil Wears Prada (Nigel Kipling (Stanley Tucci))Dr. No (Major Boothroyd (Peter Burton))The Event (Blake Sterling (Željko Ivanek))Fantastic Four (Military Interrogator (Michael 'Mick' Harrity))The Grey (Jerome Talget (Dermot Mulroney))The Guest (Spencer Peterson (Leland Orser))Gun Shy (Elliott (Richard Schiff))Hart's War (Captain Lutz (Dugald Bruce Lockhart))Hatching Pete (Coach Mackey (Brian Stepanek))The Heartbreak Kid (Mac (Rob Corddry))Holmes & Watson (Inspector Lestrade (Rob Brydon))Home Alone 3 (2019 NTV edition), (Techie (Kevin Gudahl))A Life Less Ordinary (Elliot Zweikel (Stanley Tucci))The Matrix (Choi (Marc Gray))Miss Peregrine's Home for Peculiar Children (Franklin "Frank" Portman (Chris O'Dowd))The Motorcycle Diaries (Ernesto Guevara Lynch (Jean Pierre Noher))NCIS (Stan Burley (Joel Gretsch))Nebraska (Ross Grant (Bob Odenkirk))No Sudden Move (Matt Wertz (David Harbour))Not One Less (Mayor Tian (Tian Zhenda))Oz (Tim McManus (Terry Kinney))The Three Stooges (Larry (Sean Hayes))Trainspotting (Daniel "Spud" Murphy (Ewen Bremner))T2 Trainspotting (Daniel "Spud" Murphy (Ewen Bremner))

AnimationThe Adventures of Tintin (Aristides Silk)Animaniacs (Doctor Otto Scratchansniff)Batman: The Animated Series (The Ventriloquist & Scarface)The Book of Pooh (Piglet)Cars 2 (Otis)Disney's House of Mouse (Pluto's Angel)
DuckTales (2017) (Scrooge McDuck)Home Movies (Erik Robbins)Justice League (Doctor Destiny)Looney Tunes (Marvin the Martian) (Succeeding from Kazuhiro Nakata)Mighty Morphin Power Rangers (Samurai Fan Man)My Friends Tigger & Pooh (Piglet)Piglet's Big Movie (Piglet)Pinky Dinky Doo (Mr. Guinea Pig)Planes: Fire & Rescue (Cad Spinner)Pooh's Heffalump Movie (Piglet)Sofia the First (Cedric the Sorcerer)South Park (Kenny McCormick, Tweek Tweak, Philip "Pip" Pirrup, "Grampa" (Marvin) Marsh, Gerald Broflovski, Jimbo Kern, Towelie)Space Jam: A New Legacy (Marvin the Martian)Tiny Toon Adventures (Gogo Dodo)Turning Red (Mr. Kieslowski)Winnie-the-Pooh (Piglet (second voice))X-Men (Morph)

PuppetryMuppets Tonight'' (Miss Piggy)

References

External links
 
Mausu Promotion

1961 births
Japanese male voice actors
Living people
Male voice actors from Aomori Prefecture
20th-century Japanese male actors
21st-century Japanese male actors
Mausu Promotion voice actors